Market Street Bridge is a distinguished concrete arch bridge over the Susquehanna River between Kingston and Wilkes-Barre, Luzerne County, Pennsylvania, designed by the architectural firm of Carrère and Hastings with consulting engineers Benjamin H. Davis and David A. Keefe  and built between 1926 and 1929. Six of the twelve arches are open spandrels. The architects designed four triumphal arches (or pylons) surmounted by limestone eagles with partially spread wings, intended as a memorial to veterans of the First World War. The paired pylons, two at each side of the bridge, are connected by a classical balustrade running the full length of the bridge.

In 1988, the bridge was listed on the National Register of Historic Places.

Gallery

See also
List of bridges documented by the Historic American Engineering Record in Pennsylvania

References

External links

Road bridges on the National Register of Historic Places in Pennsylvania
Historic American Engineering Record in Pennsylvania
Bridges completed in 1929
Bridges in Luzerne County, Pennsylvania
National Register of Historic Places in Luzerne County, Pennsylvania
Wilkes-Barre, Pennsylvania
Concrete bridges in the United States
Arch bridges in the United States
Bridges over the Susquehanna River
Carrère and Hastings buildings